Zyg may refer to:

 Zyg Brunner, Polish draftsman
 Zygmunt Chychła, Polish boxer
 Yang Zhuang language, ISO 639 language code

See also
 Zygii